Emily Ann Pulley (born 14 April 1967) is an American opera soprano. As of 2010, she had performed in more than 150 operas.

Education 
Pulley earned a Bachelor of Music degree, summa cum laude from West Texas A&M University in 1989 and a Master of Music degree in voice (with a focus on opera performance), in 1995, from the University of North Texas, where she studied with Pattye Johnstone.  At West Texas A&M, Pulley had been a student of  Elsie "Elsa" Ruth Porter (1920–2006).

Selected productions 

{{ordered list|type=lower-roman
|1= Peter Grimes (1995)
Metropolitan Opera

|2= La Fanciulla del West
Glimmerglass Opera
Title role

|3= The End of the AffairLyric Opera of Kansas City
Pulley as Sarah Miles

|4= 1600 Pennsylvania Avenue, (2008)
Robert Bass, conductor
Pulley was a soloist

|5= The Turn of the Screw (2010)
Pulley as The Governess

|6= Three Decembers (2010)
Central City Opera
Pulley as Beatrice
}}

 Selected discography, filmography, and videography 
Live performances of the Metropolitan Opera

 Faust CD 
 March 29, 2003
 Pulley as Marguerite

 The Merry Widow CD 
 January 27, 2004
 Emily Pulley as Valencienne

 The Magic Flute'' CD 
 April 16, 2005
 Pulley as the First lady

Awards 
 2006 — Christopher Keene Award, New York City Opera, for a performance in new or unusual repertoire

References 

1967 births
Living people
American operatic sopranos
Texas classical music
West Texas A&M University alumni
University of North Texas College of Music alumni
20th-century American women opera singers
21st-century American women opera singers